Bisile is a 2010 Indian Kannada-language film directed by Sandeep S Gowda , starring Diganth and Jennifer Kotwal in the lead roles.

Cast

 Diganth as Vicky
 Jennifer Kotwal as Anu
 Dwarakish
 M. S. Umesh
 Jai Jagadish
 Shivaram
 Lakshmi Devamma
 Sunethra Pandith
 Chithra Shenoy
 Shailaja Joshi

Music

Reception

Critical response 

Shruti Indira Lakshminarayana from Rediff.com scored the film at 2 out of 5 stars and says "Digant and Jeniffer make a good looking pair. The role offered to Diganth seems more like an extension of his lover boy image. He does a good job and proves that he can perform outside the Yograj Bhat camp as well. Jeniffer gets to do nothing but walk, smile and dance in designer wears in the first half, while she mouths a few dialogues and gets to perform a bit in the second. Actors like Jai Jagdeesh and Biradar have been wasted. Bisile could have been a perfect family entertainer if only backed by a stronger script". A critic from The Times of India scored the film at 3.5 out of 5 stars and says "Diganth and Jennifer Kotwal have shown great chemistry on-screen, while Dwarakish and Umesh are at their humorous best. Gagan-Hari's foot-tapping music keeps up the up-beat tone of the film while A R niranjan Babu's cinematography needs special mention". B S Srivani from Deccan Herald wrote "Bisile gives viewers some respite from other mindless fare currently on offer. Gagan-Rishi also impress on their maiden outing with two melodious numbers which Niranjan Babu’s camerawork has embellished. The director’s rough edges need to be smoothened out, but for all that, Bisile creates enough sunny moments. Families and youth are certain to enjoy the dialogues". A critic from Bangalore Mirror wrote  "Though the storyline is slim, it is amply made up by the dialogues, with the style of saying the unobvious that keeps the audience glued throughout. In this aspect, Diganth gets to mouth dialogues which his mentor Yograj Bhat made popular once - and it never goes over the top.  Effortless, Bisile must be Diganth's best film to date. For the visual canopy he provides,  Niranjan Babu, the cinematographer, too deserves a special mention.  Bisile is a beauty. Get in".

References

2010s Kannada-language films
2010 films